Jabalpur Engineering College (JEC) is an institute located in Jabalpur, Madhya Pradesh, India. It is the oldest technical institution in central India and the 15th-oldest in India. It is the first institute of India to have started the Electronics & Telecommunication engineering education in the country, and also the last educational institution to be set up by the British in India.
The Government of Madhya Pradesh is in the process of converting it into a Technical University.

History

JEC was established as the  Government Engineering College (GEC), Jabalpur, on 7 July 1947, during the British rule in India. It was inaugurated by the then Minister for Education of the Central Provinces, S. V. Gokhale. It started functioning from the existing building of Robertson College, Jabalpur, which was constructed in the year 1916. The building now houses the Civil engineering department of JEC, and Robertson College has been shifted to its present and permanent campus in Pachpedi. Dr. S. P. Chakravarti, the then Head of the Electrical engineering department of Indian Institute of Science (IISc), Bangalore, was appointed as its first Principal.

JEC is the first institute of India to award B.E. in Electronics & Telecommunication engineering, which it is offering since 1947, the first institute of India to award M.E. in Microwave engineering, Radio & UHF engineering, VF & Carrier Telephone engineering, and High Voltage engineering, which it is offering since 1953, and the first institute of India to award PhD in Advanced Electronics, which it is offering since 1955. JEC is the first institute of Madhya Pradesh to introduce BTech in Artificial Intelligence & Data Science and Mechatronics, and MTech in Defence technology. It has installed the first TV transmitter of India, and the first HV laboratory of India.

The Silver Jubilee ceremony of the institute was celebrated in 1972, in the presence of the then Education Minister of Madhya Pradesh, Arjun Singh. The institute celebrated its 50th anniversary in 1997, while the President of India, Dr. Shankar Dayal Sharma, Governor of Madhya Pradesh, Mohammad Shafi Qureshi and the Chief Minister of Madhya Pradesh, Digvijaya Singh, graced the Golden Jubilee ceremony. The Platinum Jubilee year was inaugurated by the Chief Minister of Madhya Pradesh, Shivraj Singh Chouhan, Technical Education Minister of Madhya Pradesh, Yashodhara Raje Scindia, and the Minister in-charge of Jabalpur, Gopal Bhargava, on 7 July 2021.

It was funded since its inception by the Government of India, until the creation of the new state of Madhya Pradesh. It was affiliated since its inception to the University of Sagar, until the creation of the University of Jabalpur, and then to the State Technological University of Madhya Pradesh. In 1997, it was granted an autonomous institute status, and in the year 2017, a proposal has been sent by the Ministry of Technical Education to the Government of Madhya Pradesh, to declare it a technical university.

Academics

Departments

Artificial Intelligence & Data Science
Mechatronics Engineering 
Civil Engineering
Electrical Engineering
Mechanical Engineering
Electronics & Telecommunications
Computer Science & Engineering
Information Technology
Industrial & Production Engineering
Department of Humanities
Department of Applied Physics
Department of Applied Chemistry
Department of Applied Mathematics

The institute offers bachelor's, master's and doctoral degrees in engineering and applied sciences.

JEC made an announcement in March 2013, that it is starting new courses in engineering like Aerospace engineering, Automotive engineering, Biomedical engineering, Chemical engineering, Marine engineering, Materials science, Neuroscience, Nanotechnology, Nanoelectronics, besides Master of Business Administration, Master of Design, Architecture, Town planning and Pharmacy.

Admissions
 B.E. / BTech – Admissions are carried out on the basis of performance in Joint Entrance Examination – Main.
 M.E. / MTech – through Graduate Aptitude Test in Engineering (GATE).
 MCA – through MP Pre-MCA examination, conducted by Madhya Pradesh Professional Examination Board.
 MSc – Every year, 15 seats are allotted for the respective departments i.e. Physics, Mathematics and Chemistry. Selection is purely based on the percentage obtained in BSc degree examination, minimum expectation is 50% for the eligibility. Departments may conduct a selection test if the number of applicants exceeds 15.
 PhD – through Graduate Aptitude Test in Engineering (GATE), followed by written test and Interview.

Accreditation
All the courses are approved by the All India Council for Technical Education, recognised by the Directorate of Technical Education, Madhya Pradesh, and accredited by the National Board of Accreditation.

Projects

The ongoing projects at JEC:
 CORE (Centre of Relevance & Excellence) by TIFAC (Department of Science & Technology, Govt. of India)
 CIIILP (Canada-India Institute Industry Linkage Project)
 Indo-Italian Research project 
 DSP Lab, Texas Instruments
 Sun Microsystems Training Centre
 Cisco Regional Academy of Networking Programme
 Centre for National & Academic Networking for Continuing Education with AICTE
 Renewable Energy Park – Govt. of India
 Centre of Fuzzy Logic System by Govt. of India
 Microzonation of selected cities of India by Geological Survey of India
 STA (State Technical Agency) and Remote Sensing Centre of Prime Minister's Rural Road Project – Govt. of India 
 Research Project of Robotics & Manufacturing, Ministry of Science & Technology
 Software Technology Park of India, 2 MBPS HSDC Node, Ministry of Information Technology
 Fuller Energy Awards (State level) Selection
 M.P. Chamber consultancy clinic of Katni with MPCON
 Mini Tool Room, Ministry of Commerce & Industries, Government of India
 ERNET- AICTE Facility for Distance Learning & Digital Library
 Remote Sensing Resource Centre, Indian Space Research Organisation (ISRO)
 MOUs signed with national & international organisations e.g. Infosys, Wipro, TCS, IBM, Cisco etc., for promoting training of students.

Student life

Housing

Events 

 TEDxJECollege, an international conference is held annually in the month of February.
 Aureole is the techno-cultural fest of Jabalpur Engineering College.
 Aaghaz is the intra-college, inter-branch sports-cum-cultural fest and is held annually.

Societies 
 Unofficial Magazine – Abhiyaam
 JEC has its own theatre club – Azaan, which provides a platform for drama, acting and dance.
 Photography society – The Camera Eye.
 Literary society – The Literary Club.
 Musical society – Raag.
 Innovation Council – IIC JEC, The Institution's Innovation Council ( initiative by mhrd ).
 Technical society for CSE /IT sector – The JEC ACM (Association for Computing Machinery).
 Technical society – JLUG (JEC Linux User Group).
 Technical society – Automotive Society.
 Technical society for Electrical Engineering and Robotics – Urja.
 JEC is also home of Kaarwaan, the social welfare society and NGO of JEC, run by college students that helps underprivileged children prepare for Jawahar Navodaya Vidyalaya Selection Test (JNVST) and other similar exams.

Notable alumni 
 Ajai Chowdhry – Co-founder & former Chairman of HCL Technologies. Awarded Padma Bhushan, the third-highest civilian honour in India. Chairman of IIT Patna and IIIT Naya Raipur, and former Chairman of IIT Hyderabad.
 Sharad Yadav – Former Union Cabinet Minister of India for Civil Aviation, Labour, Textiles, Consumer Affairs, Food & Public Distribution, Member of Parliament of the Lok Sabha and Rajya Sabha, Chairman of Janata Dal (United).
 K. S. Sudarshan – He was the fifth Sarsanghachalak (Chief) of the Rashtriya Swayamsevak Sangh (RSS), the world's largest voluntary non-governmental organisation.
 C. B. Bhave – IAS officer. Former Chairman & Managing Director of National Securities Depository Limited (NSDL) and Securities and Exchange Board of India (SEBI).
 Sharat Saxena – Veteran Indian film and television actor.
 Shyam Mardikar – Chief Technology Officer, Reliance Jio and former CTO, Bharti Airtel. Also served as an ITS officer.
 Prakash Naidu – Former Project Director, Institute for Robotics and Intelligent Systems, Bangalore.
 Shreegopal Vyas – Member of Parliament of the Rajya Sabha.
 Hemchandra Kekre – Founding Head of department, Computer Science & Engineering at IIT Bombay. Also served as a professor of Electrical Engineering at IIT-B.
Visva Mohan Tiwari – Retired Air Vice Marshal, Indian Air Force.
Sudhir Kumar Mishra – DRDS officer. Director General at the Defence Research & Development Organisation (DRDO), CEO and managing director, BrahMos Aerospace.

References

Universities and colleges in Madhya Pradesh
Engineering colleges in Madhya Pradesh
Education in Jabalpur
Educational institutions established in 1947
1947 establishments in India